Pachyptila is a genus of seabirds in the family Procellariidae and the order Procellariiformes. The members of this genus and the blue petrel form a sub-group called prions. They range throughout the southern hemisphere, often in the much cooler higher latitudes. Three species, the broad-billed prion (Pachyptila vittata), the Antarctic prion (Pachyptila desolata) and the fairy prion (Pachyptila turtur), range into the subtropics.

Taxonomy
The genus Pachyptila was introduced in 1811 by the German zoologist Johann Karl Wilhelm Illiger. The name combines the Ancient Greek pakhus  meaning "dense" or "thick" with ptilon meaning "feather" or "plumage". The type species was subsequently designated as the broad-billed prion by English naturalist Prideaux John Selby in 1840. The English name "prion" comes from the Ancient Greek  ("saw"), in reference to the serrated edges of its bill.

All the members of this genus, along with the rest of the Procellariiformes, share certain identifying features. First, they have nasal passages that attach to the upper bill called naricorns, although the nostrils on the albatross are on the sides of the bill. The bills of Procellariiformes are also unique in that they are split into between seven and nine horny plates. The genus produces a stomach oil made up of wax esters and triglycerides that is stored in the proventriculus. This can be sprayed out of their mouths as a defence against predators and as an energy-rich food source for chicks and for the adults during their long flights. Finally, they also have a salt gland that is situated above the nasal passage and helps free their bodies of the salt in the seawater they often imbibe. The gland excretes a concentrated saline solution from the nose.

Species
The genus contains the following seven species.

Behaviour
The members of this genus primarily eat zooplankton by filtering water through their upper bill. Some even hydroplane, a technique where they filter food out the water while flying with their bill in the ocean. They breed colonially, and do so near the ocean, usually with the same mate for life. Both sexes help incubate the egg, and care for the chick.

Range and habitat
They are pelagic and seldom come to land, except to breed. Also, they all stay in the Southern Hemisphere, and breed on subantarctic islands except the fairy prion which breeds on subtropical islands.

References

Sources
 
 
 
 
 

 
Bird genera
Procellariidae